Poshteh Shahan (also Romanized as Poshteh Shāhān; also known as Poshteh Shāhī) is a village in Amjaz Rural District, in the Central District of Anbarabad County, Kerman Province, Iran. At the 2006 census, its population was 50, in 10 families.

References 

Populated places in Anbarabad County